Agylla asakurana is a moth of the subfamily Arctiinae. It was described by Shōnen Matsumura in 1931. It is found in Taiwan.

References

Moths described in 1931
asakurana
Moths of Taiwan